Hellmuth Wolff may refer to:

 Hellmuth Wolff (organ builder) (1937–2013), Canadian organ builder
 Hellmuth Christian Wolff (1906–1988), German composer and musicologist